The Deer Park Community City School District is a school district located in Hamilton County, Ohio, United States, comprising the entire City of Deer Park, Ohio, a portion of Sycamore Township, and a small portion of the City of Silverton, Ohio.

The district's schools are the Deer Park Junior/Senior High School, Holmes Elementary School, and Amity Elementary School.  A fourth school building, the Howard Elementary School, is currently the home of the Deer Park Board of Education.

Beginning in 1826 in a one-room school house, current enrollment in the Deer Park City Schools is approximately 1,500 students.

References

External links
 

Educational institutions established in 1826
Education in Hamilton County, Ohio
School districts in Ohio
1826 establishments in Ohio